An atlas is a collection of maps; it is typically a bundle of maps of Earth or of a region of Earth.

Atlases have traditionally been bound into book form, but today many atlases are in multimedia formats.  In addition to presenting geographic features and political boundaries, many atlases often feature geopolitical, social, religious and economic statistics. They also have information about the map and places in it.

Etymology
The use of the word "atlas" in a geographical context dates from 1595 when the German-Flemish geographer Gerardus Mercator published  ("Atlas or cosmographical meditations upon the creation of the universe and the universe as created"). This title provides Mercator's definition of the word as a description of the creation and form of the whole universe, not simply as a collection of maps. The volume that was published posthumously one year after his death is a wide-ranging text but, as the editions evolved, it became simply a collection of maps and it is in that sense that the word was used from the middle of the 17th century. The neologism coined by Mercator was a mark of his respect for the Titan Atlas, the "King of Mauretania", whom he considered to be the first great geographer.

History of atlases

The first work that contained systematically arranged maps of uniform size representing the first modern atlas was prepared by Italian cartographer Pietro Coppo in the early 16th century; however, it was not published at that time, so it is conventionally not considered the first atlas. Rather, that title is awarded to the collection of maps  by the Brabantian cartographer Abraham Ortelius printed in 1570.

Atlases published nowadays are quite different from those published in the 16th–19th centuries. Unlike today, most atlases were not bound and ready for the customer to buy, but their possible components were shelved separately. The client could select the contents to their liking, and have the maps coloured/gilded or not. The atlas was then bound. Thus, early printed atlases with the same title page can be different in contents.

States began producing national atlases in the 19th century.

Types of atlases
A travel atlas is made for easy use during travel, and often has spiral bindings, so it may be folded flat (for example, Geographers' A–Z Map Company's A–Z atlases). It has maps at a large zoom so the maps can be reviewed easily. A travel atlas may also be referred to as a road map.

A desk atlas is made similar to a reference book. It may be in hardback or paperback form.

There are atlases of the other planets (and their satellites) in the Solar System.

Atlases of anatomy exist, mapping out organs of the human body or other organisms.

Selected atlases

Some cartographically or commercially important atlases are:

17th century and earlier:
 (Mercator, Duisburg, in present-day Germany, 1595)
Atlas Novus (Joan Blaeu, Netherlands, 1635–1658)
Atlas Maior (Blaeu, Netherlands, 1662–1667)
 (France, 1658–1676)
 (Robert Dudley, England/Italy, 1645–1661)
Piri Reis map (Piri Reis, Ottoman Empire, 1570–1612)
 (Ortelius, Netherlands, 1570–1612)
Klencke Atlas (1660; one of the world's largest books)
The Brittania (John Ogilby, 1670–1676)

18th century:
Atlas Nouveau (Amsterdam, 1742)
Britannia Depicta (London, 1720)
Cary's New and Correct English Atlas (London, 1787)

19th century:
 (Germany, 1881–1939; in the UK as Times Atlas of the World, 1895)
Rand McNally Atlas (United States, 1881–present)
 (Germany, 1817–1944)
Times Atlas of the World (United Kingdom, 1895–present)

20th century:
 (Italy, 1927–1978)
Atlas Linguisticus (Austria, 1934)
 (Soviet Union/Russia, 1937–present)
Geographers' A–Z Street Atlas (United Kingdom, 1938–present)
 (Spain, 1969/1970)
The Historical Atlas of China (China)
National Geographic Atlas of the World (United States, 1963–present)
Pergamon World Atlas (1962/1968)

21st century:
North American Environmental Atlas

See also

Atlas of Our Changing Environment
Bird atlas
Cartography
Cartopedia
Cloud atlas
European Atlas of the Seas
Fictitious entry
Geography
Google Maps
Manifold
NASA World Wind
National Atlas of the United States
Star atlas
TerraServer-USA
Theatrum Orbis Terrarum

References

External links

Sources
On the origin of the term "Atlas"

Online atlases
World Atlas
ÖROK-Atlas Online: Atlas on spatial development in Austria
Geography Network
MapChart EarthAtlas, free online atlas with interactive maps about topics like demography, economy, health and environment.
National Geographic MapMachine

History of atlases
Atlases, at the US Library of Congress site - a discussion of many significant atlases, with some illustrations.  Part of  Geography and Maps, an Illustrated Guide.

Historical atlases online
Centennia Historical Atlas required reading at the US Naval Academy for over a decade.
Historical map web sites list, Perry–Castañeda Library, University of Texas
Ryhiner Collection Composite atlas with maps, plans and views from the 16th-18th centuries, covering the globe, with about 16,000 images in total.
Manuscript Atlases held by the University of Pennsylvania Libraries - fully digitized with descriptions.
Historical Atlas in Persuasive Cartography, The PJ Mode Collection, Cornell University Library
Other links
Google Earth: a visual 3D interactive atlas.
NASA's World Wind software.
Wikimapia a wikiproject designed to describe the entire world.